Ali Muhammad Jackson (died 1987), also known as Ali Jackson, was a jazz bassist, composer, 
ethnomusicologist, actor, poet and artist.

Musical Education:
Tadd Dameron - Music Theory
Charlie Parker - Music Theory
Nasir Hafiz
Jo Jones, sr.

Live Performances with:

Billie Holiday, John Coltrane, Elvin Jones, Thad Jones, Charles Mingus, Thelonious Monk, James Moody, BuBu Turner, Mary Lou Williams.

Ethnomusicologist teaching jazz improv:

Oakland University (MI)
Oberlin College  (Ohio)
Greenwich House ( N.Y.)

Ali The Chosen And Beloved and the Silver Flutes Flourish was a musical group made up of Ali's students. Randy Harp played bass. Michael Layne, Eddie Tann and Kathy Ceasar on flutes. Marcia Miller played the tambourine. Junior Hill played the Golden Shofar, (trumpet) Tony Pantoja played conga drums. Ali The Chosen And Beloved and the Silver Flutes Flourish played for anyone under 10 and over 60 for free. The motto of the group was, Save The Children and Keep the 'Ol Folks Warm and Fed. Since the group began "giving" they played at over 50 'Ol Folks Homes and elementary schools throughout the Detroit Metropolitan area. In 1973 the group went to New York City to play live outdoor concerts from Central Park to Spanish Harlem. They became known as the most musically creative jazz group to have ever played on the streets of New York City.

Ali, the group leader was born in Detroit but spent most of his life as a professional jazz bass player in New York City. Ali played in a jazz trio with his brother, Oliver "Bops Jr." Jackson (drums) and Bu Bu Turner (piano) for a number of years. Ali returned to Detroit in 1970 to teach music at Wayne State University, Oakland University and the Metropolitan Black Arts Project funded by HUD.

Ali is quoted in a Detroit News article, dated May 28, 1974, entitled: Giving...Artists share their music with elderly. "Lend us your ears and we will return them with the sound of paradise, of jungle chants and murmuring mountain forests, of peaceful meditative mornings and quick excitement."

Grants:

National Endowment for the Arts, 1975 & 1976 for the composition of " Asalat" (i.e. prayer) 5 movement suite for 5 flutes, 4 basses, 1 tuba, 5 ancestral drums.

His composition "Prayer to the East" was the title track of Yusef Lateef's 1957 album.  Bassist George Mraz has used this line as a feature calling it "Denzil,s Best".

In the late 1940s, Jackson was a member of a quartet, the AHJOs, named after the initials of each musician: Ali, Roland "Hack" Hanna, Joe (tenor saxophonist Joe Alexander) and Oliver, his brother.

He was briefly in the house band at the Blue Bird Inn, led by Billy Mitchell (together with his brother).

In the 1980s he performed in his brother's quintet, which toured and recorded in Europe. The line-up of the Oliver Jackson Quintet that performed in Switzerland in 1984 comprised Oliver Jackson, Arnett Cobb, Irving Stokes, tp - Claude Black, and Ali Jackson.

Junior Hill, one of Ali's most loved students posted a 1972 article from the Detroit News, June Browns Detroit, "The Sounds of a Jazzman who is 41 years of rage" at https://www.facebook.com/pandinproghoth

The Detroit News, 1974 "Giving" (free music therapy for the elderly).
The Detroit Free Press, 1974 "Sound Sends Cherished Ones" (free music therapy for the elderly)

Ali's Programs: Save the Children and Keep the Ol' Foke Warm and Fed
  
His son, Ali Jackson, Jr., is a jazz drummer and former drummer of the Jazz at Lincoln Center Orchestra.

Discography
1954: recorded with Lionel Hampton
1956: Alex Kallao #Jazz at Ottawa University"
1956: John Coltrane "Dial Africa (Arista)
1956: Wilbur Harden (Savoy)
1962: "Gretsch Drum Night at Birdland" (Roulette)
1966:  Hank Crawford 
1958: Jazz Way Out - John Coltrane/Wilbur Harden
1958: Tanganyika Strut - John Coltrane/Wilbur Harden
1984: Billie's Bounce - Oliver Jackson Quintet

References

American jazz double-bassists
Male double-bassists
1987 deaths
Year of birth missing
American male jazz musicians